The Tellermine 42 (T.Mi.42) was a German metal-cased anti-tank blast mine used during the Second World War. The mine was a development of the Tellermine 35 with improved resistance to blast. It was followed by the simplified Tellermine 43.
The Tellermine consists of a circular pressed steel main body with a large central pressure plate. The pressure plate is smaller than the earlier Tellermine 35, which increases the mine's resistance to blast. Two secondary fuze wells are provided for anti-handling devices, one in the side, and one on the bottom of the mine. The mine has a carrying handle.

The T.Mi.Z.43 pressure fuze can be fitted to Tellermine 42s. The T.Mi.Z.43 fuze is notable for featuring an integral anti-handling device as standard: when the fuze is inserted and the pressure plate screwed down into place, it shears a weak arming pin in the fuze with an audible "snap". This action arms the anti-handling device. Thereafter, any attempt to disarm the mine by unscrewing the pressure plate (to remove the fuze) will automatically trigger detonation. Since it is impossible to determine which fuze type has been installed, no pressure plate should ever be removed from a Tellermine.

Specifications
 Height: 
 Diameter: 
 Weight: 
 Explosive content:  of TNT  or 50/50 Amatol
 Trigger weight:

References
 Jane's Mines and Mine Clearance 2005-2006
 TM-E 30-451, Handbook of German Military Forces

Anti-tank mines
World War II infantry weapons of Germany
Land mines of Germany
Military equipment introduced from 1940 to 1944